Frank Ignatz Blank  (October 18, 1892 – December 8, 1961) was a catcher in Major League Baseball. He played in one game for the St. Louis Cardinals on August 15, 1909 and was hitless in two at-bats.

External links

1892 births
1961 deaths
Baseball players from Missouri
Major League Baseball catchers
St. Louis Cardinals players
Jacksonville Lunatics players
Kewanee Boilermakers players
Burlington Pathfinders players
Guthrie Senators players
Taylorville Christians players
Lyons Lions players